Franz Denniz Brorsson (born 30 January 1996) is a Swedish professional footballer who plays as a centre back for Aris Limassol in the Cypriot First Division.

Club career

Malmö FF
On 19 December 2014 Brorsson signed a first team contract for two years on a youth basis with Malmö FF. Brorsson had previously made his competitive debut for the club in the Svenska Cupen match against IS Halmia on 15 November 2014.

International career
He made his debut for Sweden national football team on 8 January 2017 in a friendly against Ivory Coast.

Personal life
Brorsson is named after the former German footballer Franz Beckenbauer. He is the son of former footballer Jonas Brorsson and brother of fellow footballer Freddie Brorsson.

Career statistics
As of 8 December 2021.

Honours

Malmö FF
 Allsvenskan: 2016, 2017, 2020, 2021

References

External links
  
 
 
 

1996 births
Living people
Swedish footballers
Swedish expatriate footballers
Association football defenders
Sweden youth international footballers
Sweden under-21 international footballers
Sweden international footballers
Footballers from Skåne County
Malmö FF players
Esbjerg fB players
Aris Limassol FC players
Allsvenskan players
Danish Superliga players
Cypriot First Division players
People from Trelleborg
Swedish expatriate sportspeople in Denmark
Expatriate men's footballers in Denmark
Swedish expatriate sportspeople in Cyprus
Expatriate footballers in Cyprus